Gangelin is a surname. Notable people with the surname include:

 Paul Gangelin (1898–1961), American screenwriter
 Victor A. Gangelin (1899–1967), American set decorator